Malyarov (masculine) or Malyarova (feminine) is a Russian surname. Notable people with the surname include:

Kirill Malyarov (born 1997), Russian footballer
Nikita Malyarov (born 1989), Russian footballer
Igor Malyarov (1965-2003), Soviet Russian politician and journalist

Russian-language surnames